Sportfreunde Seligenstadt is a German association football club based in Seligenstadt, Hesse.

History
The club was founded 2 October 1946 and, in addition to a football department, included sections for athletics, chess, and table tennis. The following year a gymnastics department was added, and the club has since grown to include archery, fitness, Ju Jitsu, tennis, volleyball, and a seniors section.

The footballers played for a number of seasons in the Verbandsliga Hessen-Süd until winning the league in 2013 and earning promotion to the Hessenliga.

Honours
The club's honours:
 Verbandsliga Hessen-Süd
 Champions: 2013
 Runners-up: 2009

References

External links
Official team site (football)
Official team site (sports club)
Some pictures of the stadium of Sportfreunde Seligenstadt

Football clubs in Germany
Football clubs in Hesse
Athletics clubs in Germany
Association football clubs established in 1946
1946 establishments in Germany